Ri Kyong-hui or Li Gyong-hui (born 11 August 1967) is a former North Korean female cross-country skier. She competed at the 1992 Winter Olympics representing North Korea.

References

External links 
Profile at Data.fis-ski

1967 births
Living people
Olympic cross-country skiers of North Korea
Cross-country skiers at the 1992 Winter Olympics
North Korean female cross-country skiers
Asian Games medalists in cross-country skiing
Cross-country skiers at the 1986 Asian Winter Games
Cross-country skiers at the 1990 Asian Winter Games
Asian Games bronze medalists for North Korea
Medalists at the 1986 Asian Winter Games
Medalists at the 1990 Asian Winter Games